is a railway station in the city of Tsuruga, Fukui Prefecture, Japan, operated by West Japan Railway Company (JR West).

Lines

Station layout
The station consists of one island platform connected to the station building by a level crossing. The station is unattended.

Platforms

History
Awano Station opened on 15 December 1917.  With the privatization of Japanese National Railways (JNR) on 1 April 1987, the station came under the control of JR West.

Passenger statistics
In fiscal 2016, the station was used by an average of 66 passengers daily (boarding passengers only).

Surrounding area
Tsuruga National Medical Center

See also
 List of railway stations in Japan

References

External links

  

Railway stations in Fukui Prefecture
Stations of West Japan Railway Company
Railway stations in Japan opened in 1917
Obama Line
Tsuruga, Fukui